Emmet Byrne is a retired Irish rugby union player. He played at prop-forward for Wanderers FC, St Mary's College RFC, Blackrock College RFC and Leinster. He also won nine caps between 2001 and 2003 for Ireland. Following retirement from professional rugby union, Byrne graduated from medical school at the Royal College of Physicians in Ireland. He subsequently began training as a general practitioner.

References

Leinster Rugby players
St Mary's College RFC players
Blackrock College RFC players
Wanderers F.C. (rugby union) players
Irish rugby union players
Ireland international rugby union players
Living people
1973 births
Rugby union players from Dublin (city)
Rugby union props
21st-century Irish medical doctors